Montana is a state located in the Western United States. According to the 2020 United States Census, Montana is the 7th least populous state with  inhabitants but the 4th largest by land area spanning  of land. Montana is divided into 56 counties and contains 129 municipalities consisting of cities and towns. The Montana Code 7-1-4124 gives municipal governments in Montana powers to  enact ordinances, borrow money, and enact eminent domain among other legal powers.

In Montana, municipalities are divided into four classes by state statute based on their population. Members of the three largest classes are deemed cities, while the members of the fourth class are called towns. Cities and towns are classified at the time of their organization, and are reorganized when they change classification due to an increase or decrease in population. A place may incorporate as a town with the support of 300 electors or two-thirds of the registered electors. A municipality with a population between 1,000 and 5,000 people is a Third Class city. A municipality with a population between 5,000 and 10,000 people is a Second Class city. And a municipality with a population over 10,000 people is a First Class city. Under certain exceptions municipalities with a population of between 9,000 and 10,000 may elect by resolution to be either a First or Second Class city. Under similar exceptions municipalities with a population of between 5,000 and 7,500 may elect by resolution to be either a Second or Third Class city. Municipalities with a population of between 1,000 and 2,500 may by resolution be classified as either a town or Third Class city. Unincorporated places such as census-designated places fall outside this scheme, and are subject to county governance, and thus are not towns or cities.

The largest municipality by population in Montana is Billings with 117,116 residents, and the smallest municipality by population is Ismay with 17 residents.

List of cities and towns

See also
List of counties in Montana
List of ghost towns in Montana
List of places in Montana

References

Montana, List of cities and towns in
Municipalities in Montana
Cities and towns
Montana